Fight of the Tertia is a 1952 West German family film directed by Erik Ode and starring Brigitte Rau, Wolfgang Jansen and Horst Köppen. It was shot at the Wandsbek Studios in Hamburg and on location around the city. The film's sets were designed by the art director Hans Luigi. It is based on the 1928 novel of the same name by Wilhelm Speyer which was previously adapted into a 1929 silent film. Youth gangs clash in a small town on the Baltic Sea.

Cast
 Brigitte Rau as Daniela
 Wolfgang Jansen as Borst
 Horst Köppen as Knötzinger Jr.
 Franz-Otto Krüger as Knötzinger
 Gert Andreae as Alexander Kirchholtes
 Hans Stiebner as Biersack
 Adalbert Kriwat as Falk
 Alexander Hunzinger as Polizeiwachtmeister Holzapfel
 Helmuth Rudolph as principal
 Rolf Weih as Dr. Frey
 Günther Jerschke as Dr. Grau
 Kurt Waitzmann as school nurse
 Frank Riedmüller as Tertian
 Dieter von Barany as Tertian
 Charles Brauer as Tertian
 Horst Höfer as Tertian
 Thomas Langenheim as Tertian
 Jürgen Cziesla as Tertian
 Wolfgang Thomas as Tertian
 Hubert von Albedyll]] as Tertian
 Peter Winter as Tertian
 Wolfgang Ehrlich as Tertian

Bibliography

External links
 

1952 films
German drama films
1952 drama films
1950s German-language films
West German films
Films based on German novels
Films set on islands
Films set in the Baltic Sea
Films set in schools
Remakes of German films
Sound film remakes of silent films
German black-and-white films
1950s German films
Films shot at Wandsbek Studios